Compacta hirtaloidalis is a species of moth in the family Crambidae. It was described by Harrison Gray Dyar Jr. in 1912. It is found in Mexico and the southern United States, where it has been recorded from Arizona.

References

Moths described in 1912
Spilomelinae